Aghalaya  is a village in the southern state of Karnataka, India. It is located in the Krishnarajpet taluk of Mandya district in Karnataka.
Aghalaya village is famous for the ancient Malleswara temple of lord Shiva.

Etymology
Agha means Sin and Laya means  to Annihilate in Sanskrit language. Lord Malleshwara is believed to be the annihilator of people's sins in the place, so the place is called as Aghalaya.

See also
 Mandya
 Districts of Karnataka

References

External links
 http://Mandya.nic.in/

Villages in Mandya district